The Avatr 11 is a fully-electric mid-size luxury crossover SUV announced in late 2021 by AVATR Technology and on sale since August 2022. Avatr is a joint venture between Changan Automobile, lithium-ion battery provider CATL, and Huawei, the Avatr 11 is underpinned by the EP1 platform. In 2018, a joint venture formed between Changan and Nio. Later, CATL replaced NIO as the second biggest shareholder when Nio withdrew during a financial crisis. Right now, Changan holds 40.99% of shares, and CATL owns 17.1%. Huawei has no shares in Avatr while supplying the hardware including electric motors and software for intelligent driving, connectivity, and infotainment.

Overview 

The Avatr 11 is a mid-size luxury fastback crossover offered in either four-seat or five-seat variants. The interior is dominated by a dashboard that houses a 10.25-inch digital instrument cluster, a 15.6-inch infotainment screen, and a 10.25-inch passenger display. There are also two wireless charging pads and a 14-speaker sound system complete with Road Noise Cancellation and an Active Sound Enhancement system. The Avatr 11 is equipped with Huawei's HarmonyOS and DriveONE twin-motor four-wheel drive systems. Avatr is the second co-developed brand of Huawei and OEMs that has settled in Huawei's stores after AITO, which was developed by Huawei and Seres. The intelligent driving system of Avatr 11  sports 34 different sensors, including 3 LiDARS, allowing for assisted driving on highways and smaller roads, with lane change assist, traffic light recognition, and pedestrian detection as the key features.

The pricing of the Avatr 11 starts at $51,800 and there are three trim levels of the car, all with dual-motor AWD setup as standard. Deliveries of the two cheaper variants of the Avatr 11 are scheduled to begin in December 2022. The top-of-the-trim model is expected to follow in the first quarter of 2023. In addition to the three regular trim levels, Avatr also offers a limited edition variant called Avatr 011, priced at RMB 600,000.

Specifications 
The Avatr 11 is powered by a pair of electric motors that combine to produce 578 hp and 479 lb-ft (650 Nm) of torque. The motors were developed by Huawei and the front motor develops a maximum output of 265 hp while the rear motor develops a maximum output of 313 hp.

References 

Avatr 11
Electric concept cars
Luxury crossover sport utility vehicles
Production electric cars
Cars introduced in 2021